Eddie Root (1902–1986)  was an Australian rugby league footballer who played in the 1920s and 1930s. A New South Wales state and Australia national representative forward, his club career was played in Sydney with South Sydney, Newtown and St. George. Enlisted in World War I at the age of just 16 years, he had the distinction of being the last representative footballer to go to the Great War.

Playing career
A South Sydney junior, Root started playing first grade for Souths in 1923, becoming a mainstay in the side in 1926. That year he first tasted premiership success with Souths, who also won the following two years' competitions. He was sent off in the 1926 decider against University. He made his representative debut for New South Wales in 1927 and was regularly selected for the Blues over the next six seasons. He was selected to go on the 1929–30 Kangaroo tour of Great Britain, playing in fifteen tour matches but no Tests. When the NSWRL changed the South Sydney/Newtown boundary distinction in 1930 Root spent the following season with Newtown due to the strict residential criteria of the time. He then returned to Souths and played in the back-to-back premiership-winning Souths sides of 1931 and 1932. 

In 1935 he was signed by St. George and scored two tries in the record-breaking 91–6 win over competition newcomers Canterbury-Bankstown before later becoming the club's captain-coach. He played with Saints for two seasons before retiring. His son, Stan Root was also a St. George Dragons player between 1941 and 1950.

Death
Root died on 7 May 1986 at Brighton-Le-Sands, New South Wales,

References

Sources
 Whiticker, Alan  & Hudson, Glen (2006) The Encyclopedia of Rugby League Players, Gavin Allen Publishing, Sydney
 Andrews, Malcolm (2006) The ABC of Rugby League Austn Broadcasting Corpn, Sydney

External links
Eddie Root at yesterdayshero.com.au
Eddie Root at nrlstats.com

1902 births
1986 deaths
Australia national rugby league team players
Australian military personnel of World War I
City New South Wales rugby league team players
New South Wales rugby league team players
Newtown Jets players
Rugby league players from Sydney
Rugby league props
Rugby league second-rows
South Sydney Rabbitohs players
Sportsmen from New South Wales
St. George Dragons captains
St. George Dragons coaches
St. George Dragons players